Nikolas Epifaniou (born 10 November 1971) is a Cypriot sailor. He competed at the 1992 Summer Olympics and the 1996 Summer Olympics.

References

External links
 

1971 births
Living people
Cypriot male sailors (sport)
Olympic sailors of Cyprus
Sailors at the 1992 Summer Olympics – 470
Sailors at the 1996 Summer Olympics – 470
Place of birth missing (living people)